Serge Beaudoin (born November 30, 1952) is a Canadian former professional ice hockey player who played 332 games in the World Hockey Association and 3 games in the National Hockey League.  He played for the Phoenix Roadrunners, Cincinnati Stingers, Birmingham Bulls, Vancouver Blazers, and Atlanta Flames.

Career statistics

References

External links

1952 births
Atlanta Flames players
Binghamton Dusters players
Birmingham Bulls players
Canadian ice hockey defencemen
Cincinnati Stingers players
Ice hockey people from Montreal
Laval Saints players
Living people
Philadelphia Flyers draft picks
Phoenix Roadrunners (WHA) players
Roanoke Valley Rebels (EHL) players
Roanoke Valley Rebels (SHL) players
Trois-Rivières Ducs players
Tulsa Oilers (1964–1984) players
Vancouver Blazers players
Canadian expatriate ice hockey players in the United States